Wide World Hits is the title of a recording by the instrumental group the String-A-Longs, released on Atco SD 33-241. (According to the aforewikilinked article, the album is actually performed by the Fireballs.)

Critical response
Wayne Harada of the Honolulu Advertiser called it "a plucky good time."

Track listing

Side one
 "More" (Riz Ortolani/Nino Oliviero/Norman Newell/M. Ciorciolini)– 2:32
 "Places I Remember" (Norman Petty)– 2:10
 "Love Is Blue" (Andre Popp/Pierre Cour)– 2:20
 "La Pobracita (Poor Little One)" (George Tomsco)– 1:48
 "Silence Is Golden" (Bob Gaudio/Bob Crewe)– 3:06
 "Black Grass" (Ken Jordan/Ken Davis)– 2:20

Side two
 "There Is a Mountain" (Donovan Leitch)– 2:12
 "I'll Be There" (George Tomsco/Barbara Tomsco)– 3:10
 "Blue Guitar" (Johnny Duncan)– 2:08
 "Groovin'" (Felix Cavaliere/Eddie Brigati)– 2:33
 "Black Is Black" (Tony Hayes/Steve Wadey/M. Grainger)– 2:58
 "Someone Stronger" (George Tomsco/Barbara Tomsco)– 2:40

Notes

References

1968 albums
Atco Records albums
Instrumental albums
Albums produced by Norman Petty
The String-A-Longs albums